Sandra Gómez (born 30 December 1971) is a Colombian former professional racing cyclist. She won the Colombian National Road Race Championships in 2007. She won the Individual Pursuit bronze medal in the 2002 Pan American Championships.

References

External links
 

1971 births
Living people
Colombian female cyclists
Cyclists at the 2003 Pan American Games
Place of birth missing (living people)
Pan American Games competitors for Colombia
20th-century Colombian women
21st-century Colombian women